Beast Lake is a natural lake in St. Louis County, Minnesota, in the United States. A variant name is Wilson Lake. Beast Lake is located in Voyageurs National Park. The  Beast Lake Trail is ranked "moderate" difficulty by the National Park Service. Fishing at Beast Lake is prohibited.

See also
List of lakes in Minnesota

References

Lakes of Minnesota
Lakes of St. Louis County, Minnesota
Voyageurs National Park